I Wanna Be A Model(我要做Model2) is a reality show hosted by Dylan Liong and Lynn Lim, which aims to find the next top fashion model in Malaysia.

The series featured a cast of 20 contestants (10 male models and 10 female models) will compete with each other to become the ultimate male and female supermodel.  The  participants will have to outshine each other on the catwalk fashion shows, photo shoots, self-make up and self-styling assignments and in video clip shoots.

Michael & Angie are the winners for this season, winning over Jit Shiong & Brandy.

Summaries

Contestants
(In order of elimination)

Ryan Yip Khay Hoong (23) & Jessie Chuah Shi Ping (22)
Aaron Lee (18) & Tiffany Lim Guan Ping (20)
Disney Choi (20) & Jojo Kwan Li Xian (18)
Jimmie (19) & Chris Wai Shu Jun (23)
Alan (21) & Janice Chen Yu Wei (22)
Darric (21) & Kiwi Hsu Yi Wei (21)
Kiyoshi Kwok (23) & Suzanne Looi Ai Zhu (23)
Phirence Chen Ji Pin (24) & Joey Chin Yan Mei (19)
Jit Shiong Yang Ri Xiong (23) & Brandy Chia Shi Zhi (20) (runners-up)
Michael Wong Jun Jie (23) & Angie Seow Pei Ying (18) (winners)

Call out order

 The contestant won the reward challenge.
 The contestant was eliminated.
 The contestant was part of a non-elimination bottom two
 The contestant won the competition.
 The runner-up contestant.

Photo shoot guide
Week 02 Photo shoot: Own Style
Week 03 Photo shoot: Promotional
Week 04 Photo shoot: Denim Wear (Levi's Jeans)
Week 05 Video: Fashion Show
Week 06 Photo shoot: Back to School
Week 07 Photo shoot: Postage Wrap
Week 08 Photo shoot: Oriental
Week 09 Photo shoot: British Rock
Week 10 Photo shoot: SISTERS Magazine Cover Shoot
Week 11 Photo shoot: Kleenex Ad; Water Floating
Week 12 Photo shoot: Pet; Avant Garde
Week 13 Photo shoot: Editorial shoot in Sentosa Island, Singapore

Judges
Priscllia Yee: International Model
Addy Lee: Hairstylist
Christopher Liew: Fashion Photographer

I Wanna Be A Model
2007 Malaysian television seasons